Babaocai is a typical Chinese dish that is made by frying various vegetables and seafood in oil.

Babaocai is a combination of eight ingredients. "Babao" (八寶) means "eight treasures," and cai (菜) means "vegetables," "dishes," or "side dishes." Babaocai contains seafood such as sea cucumbers, shrimp, squid, and vegetables such as bamboo shoots. Sprinkle chili oil on a large, hollow plate and roast the seafood and ingredients.

The dish is known as Palbochae in Korean and as Happosai in Japanese.

History 
There are various theories about the origin of Babaocai. In the end of the Qing Dynasty of China, the mokjung Emperor's birth mother was a renowned gourmet known to order 120 kinds of side dishes. Her chefs would prepare the sides dishes, taste the remaining ingredients, and then taste the food. Another theory is that in the 11th century, farmers in Liaoning province began to eat various foods they once ate with tea while chatting during work breaks.

See also 
 Chinese cuisine

References 

Chinese cuisine